Diospyros oligantha is a tree in the family Ebenaceae. Inflorescences bear up to 10 flowers. The specific epithet  is from the Greek meaning "few-flowered", referring to the inflorescences. D. oligantha is endemic to Borneo.

References

oligantha
Endemic flora of Borneo
Trees of Borneo
Plants described in 1929